Giant Sparrow is an American independent video game company based in Santa Monica, California, led by creative director Ian Dallas. Its first game, The Unfinished Swan, was released in 2012 for the PlayStation 3 and 2014 for PlayStation 4. The company's most recent project is What Remains of Edith Finch, a PlayStation 4 and Windows game released in 2017. The game was published by Annapurna Interactive, a branch of Annapurna Pictures.

Games

The Unfinished Swan is a game set in a surreal, blank world, in which the player, a boy named Monroe, chases a swan that has escaped a painting. The player must throw paint at their white surroundings to reveal the world. The game was released for the PlayStation 3 on October 23, 2012 and subsequently for PlayStation 4 and Vita.

What Remains of Edith Finch is a first-person narrative adventure game. It was released for Microsoft Windows and PlayStation 4 on April 25, 2017. On December 7, 2017, it was awarded the "Best Narrative" for 2017 by The Game Awards.

A new game is in development, "focusing on the enchanting beauty of animal locomotion".

References

External links
 

Companies based in Santa Monica, California
Video game companies established in 2009
2009 establishments in California
Video game companies based in California
Video game development companies
American companies established in 2009
Indie video game developers